This is a List of rulers of Sintang in Kalimantan, Indonesia.

Overview 
The state of Sintang was ruled by an unnamed dynasty. The rulers were:

 Abang Samat Semah, Prince of Sintang.
 Abang Ismail Zubair Mail Jubairi Irawan II, Prince of Sintang
 Abang Suruh, Prince of Sintang, son of Abang Ismail Zubair Mail Jubairi Irawan II, Prince of Sintang
 Abang Tembilang Ari, Prince of Sintang
 ca. 1600-1643 Abang Pencin Pontin, Pangeran Agung Pandeling, Pangeran of Sintang
 ca. 1643-1672 Pangeran Tunggal
 1672 - 1738 Sri Paduka Sultan Muhammad Shams ud-din Sa'id ul-Khairiwaddien Sultan Nata, Sultan of Sintang
 1738 - 1786 Sri Paduka Sultan 'Abdu'l Rahman Muhammad Jalal ud-din ibni al-Marhum Sultan Muhammad Shams ud-din Sa'id ul-Khairiwaddien Sultan Aman, Sultan of Sintang
 1786 - 1796 Sri Paduka Sultan 'Abdu'l Rashid Muhammad Jamal ud-din ibni al-Marhum Sultan 'Abdu'l Rahman Muhammad Jalal ud-din Sultan Ajib, Sultan of Sintang.
 1796 - 1851 Sri Paduka Sultan Muhammad Qamar ud-din ibni al-Marhum Sultan 'Abdu'l Rashid Muhammad Jamal ud-din, Sultan of Sintang
 1851 - 1855 Sri Paduka Sultan Muhammad Jamal ud-din II ibni al-Marhum Sultan Muhammad Qamar ud-din Sultan of Sintang
 1855 - 1889 Sri Paduka Tuanku 'Abdu'l Said ibni al-Marhum Sultan Muhammad Jamal ud-din, Panembahan Kusuma Negara I Panembahan of Sintang
 1889 - 1905 Sri Paduka Tuanku Ismail ibni al-Marhum Panembahan 'Abdu'l Said, Panembahan Kusuma Negara II Panembahan of Sintang.
 1905 - 1913 Sri Paduka Tuanku Haji Gusti Adi 'Abdu'l-Majid ibni al-Marhum Panembahan Ismail, Panembahan Kusuma Negara III Panembahan of Sintang
 1913 - 1934 Ade Muhammad Jun 'Abdu'l-Kadir Pangeran Adipati Temenggong Setia Agama Wakil Panembahan of Sintang.
 1934 - 1944 Sri Paduka Tuanku Muhammad Jamal ud-din ibni al-Marhum Panembahan Haji Gusti Adi 'Abdu'l-Majid, Panembahan Kusuma Negara IV Panembahan of Sintang
 1944 - 1947 Sri Paduka Paduka Tuanku Muhammad Shams ud-din ibni al-Marhum Radin Panji Negara Gusti 'Abdu'l Rahman, Panembahan Kusuma Negara V Panembahan of Sintang

Bibliography 
 Fienieg, Anouk, Sejarah Sintang - The History of Sintang : A Collection of Books, Manuscripts, Archives and Articles, 2007

Sintang
Indonesian monarchs
Indonesia history-related lists